The Warsaw Marathon (Polish: Maraton Warszawski pronounced: , also referred to as the PZU Warsaw Marathon) is an annual marathon event which takes place on the streets of Warsaw, Poland. It is the oldest annual marathon in Poland, held since 1979. The marathon is organized by the non-governmental organization Fundacja Maraton Warszawski.  The race usually takes place on the last Sunday of September.

It is one of two marathons hosted in the city, alongside the Orlen Warsaw Marathon, generally held in April. The marathon is one of five in the Crown of Polish Marathons program, along with the Dębno, Kraków, Poznań, and Wrocław Marathons.

Polish competitors have traditionally triumphed in the early editions of the event both in the men's and women's competitions. However, since the fall of communism in 1989, the race has attracted more international participants who started to dominate the race. The current course records are 2:08:17 hours for men, set by John Kibet of Kenya in 2011, while Ethiopian Demissie Ayantu's run of 2:28:35 in 2022 is the fastest by a woman on the course.

History 

The marathon was first held on  under the original name "1st Marathon of Peace" (to convince socialistic regime about the idea of "run for health, run for all"). It happened thanks to the three brave people: Tomasz Hopfer (TVP journalist and runner), Józef Węgrzyn (journalist and runner) and Zbigniew Zaremba (1st director of the Warsaw Marathon; and running coach).

In 2000 the men's race and in 2012 the women's race had the status of Polish Marathon National Championships.

From 2013, the Polish insurance company Powszechny Zakład Ubezpieczeń (PZU) became a title sponsor, and the marathon was renamed "PZU Warsaw Marathon".

In 2020, due to the coronavirus pandemic, organizers rescheduled the marathon to take place over four separate heats during the weekend, with each heat having a maximum of 250 runners. Since nearly 2000 runners had already registered for the race, a lottery was held to determine who was allowed to participate, with those denied a spot allowed to transfer their entry to 2021 or obtain a refund.

Other races 
Although the main attraction is the marathon, there is also a handbike marathon and a "High Five Race" (5 km race). Since 2022, a 10-kilometre race aimed at beginners known as the Pekao SA Warszawska Dycha has also been organized as part of the event.

Other activities 
During the marathon weekend, additional activities take place, such as a sport and fitness expo, running seminars, and activities for children.

Results 
Key:

Multiple wins

By country

See also 
Orlen Warsaw Marathon
Cracovia Marathon
Poznań Marathon
Sport in Poland

Notes

References

External links 
 Warsaw Marathon
 Marathon Info

Marathons in Europe
Marathon
Marathons in Poland
Recurring sporting events established in 1979
1979 establishments in Poland
September sporting events
Autumn events in Poland